László Rajcsányi (16 February 1907 – 5 September 1992) was a Hungarian fencer. He won a gold medal in the team sabre event at the 1936, 1948 and 1952 Summer Olympics.

References

External links
 

1907 births
1992 deaths
Hungarian male sabre fencers
Olympic fencers of Hungary
Fencers at the 1936 Summer Olympics
Fencers at the 1948 Summer Olympics
Fencers at the 1952 Summer Olympics
Olympic gold medalists for Hungary
Olympic medalists in fencing
Fencers from Budapest
Medalists at the 1936 Summer Olympics
Medalists at the 1948 Summer Olympics
Medalists at the 1952 Summer Olympics